The Uttar Pradesh Legislative Council (Hindi: Uttar Pradesh Vidhan Parishad) is the upper house of the bicameral legislature of Uttar Pradesh, a state in India. Uttar Pradesh is one of the six states in India, where the state legislature is bicameral, comprising two houses: the Vidhan Sabha (Legislative Assembly) and the Vidhan Parishad (Legislative Council). The Vidhan Parishad is a permanent House, consisting of 100 members.

History
The Uttar Pradesh Vidhan Parishad came into existence by the Government of India Act of 1935. The Legislative Council consisted of 60 members. The term of a member of the Council was six years with one-third of its members retiring after every two years. The Houses enjoyed the right of electing their Presiding Officers known as the President. The first meeting of the Legislative Council was held on 29 July 1937. Sir Sitaram and Begum Aijaz Rasul were elected the President and the Vice-President of the Legislative Council respectively. Sir Sitaram was in office until 9 March 1949. Chandra Bhal became the next Chairman on 10 March 1949.

After the independence and adoption of the constitution on 26 January 1950 Chandra Bhal was re-elected the Chairman of the Legislative Council and served until 5 May 1958. Sri Nizamuddin was elected the Deputy Chairman of the Council on 27 May 1952. He served until 1964.

Nominations and election
When, under the provisions of the Government of India Act 1935, the Legislative Council came into existence in the United Provinces, it comprised 60 members. On 26 January 1950, the total membership of the Vidhan Parishad (legislative council) of Uttar Pradesh state was increased from 60 to 72.  With the Constitution (Seventh Amendment) Act 1956, the strength of the Council was enhanced to 108. After the reorganization of Uttar Pradesh state in November 2000 and the creation of Uttarakhand state, this strength has now reduced to 100.

Composition of Legislative Council 
The present composition of the Vidhan Parishad is as follows: 
 10 members are nominated by the governor of Uttar Pradesh.
 38 members are elected by the Uttar Pradesh Legislative Assembly members.
 36 members are elected by the Local bodies.
 8 members are elected by the teachers.
 8 members are elected by the graduates.

Party Wise Composition

Term 
Members are now elected or nominated for six years and one-third of them retire on the expiration of every second year, so a member continues as such for six years. The vacant seats are filled up by fresh elections and nominations (by Governor) at the beginning of every third year. The retiring members are also eligible for re-election and re-nomination any number of times. The Presiding Officers of Vidhan Parishad are Chairman and Deputy Chairman. Kunwar Manvendra Singh is the current Chairman of the Uttar Pradesh Legislative Councils.

Constituencies and members (100)
See here the List of members of the Uttar Pradesh Legislative Council

The following are the constituencies of the Uttar Pradesh Vidhan Parishad:

Members elected by Legislative Assembly (38) 
Keys:

Local Authorities Constituencies (36) 
Keys:

Elected from Graduates Constituencies (8)
Keys:

Elected from Teachers Constituencies (8)
Keys:

Nominated by Governor (10)
Keys:

See also
Uttar Pradesh Legislative Assembly

Notes

References

External links
Government of Uttar Pradesh official website

 
1935 establishments in India